Yu Hui (born 1 December 1965) is a Chinese actress. She was born in Qingdao, grew up in Shenyang, and graduated from Shanghai Theatre Academy.

Selected filmography

Film

Television Series

References

External links

1965 births
Living people
Chinese film actresses
Chinese television actresses
Actresses from Qingdao
20th-century Chinese actresses
21st-century Chinese actresses
Shanghai Theatre Academy alumni